The superior gluteal nerve is a nerve that originates in the pelvis. It supplies the gluteus medius muscle, the gluteus minimus muscle, the tensor fasciae latae muscle, and the piriformis muscle.

Structure
The superior gluteal nerve originates in the sacral plexus. It arises from the posterior divisions of L4, L5 and S1. It leaves the pelvis through the greater sciatic foramen above the piriformis muscle. It is accompanied by the superior gluteal artery and the superior gluteal vein. It then accompanies the upper branch of the deep division of the superior gluteal artery. It ends in the gluteus minimus muscle and tensor fasciae latae muscle.

Function
The superior nerve supplies:

 tensor fasciae latae muscle.
 gluteus minimus muscle.
 gluteus medius muscle.
 piriformis muscle.

The superior gluteal nerve also has a cutaneous branch.

Clinical significance

Gait 
In normal gait, the small gluteal muscles on the stance side can stabilize the pelvis in the coronal plane. Weakness or paralysis of these muscles caused by a damaged superior gluteal nerve can result in a weak abduction in the affected hip joint. This gait disturbance is known as Trendelenburg gait. In a positive Trendelenburg's sign the pelvis sags toward the normal unsupported side (the swing leg). The opposite, when the pelvis is elevated on the swing side, is known as Duchenne limp.  Bilateral loss of the small gluteal muscles results in a waddling gait.

Iatrogenic damage 
The superior gluteal nerve may be damaged by intramuscular injections and nephrectomy.

See also
 Inferior gluteal nerve
 Trendelenburg's sign

References

Bibliography

External links
 

Nerves of the lower limb and lower torso

pl:Nerw sromowy